In matrix theory, Sylvester's formula or Sylvester's matrix theorem (named after J. J. Sylvester) or Lagrange−Sylvester interpolation expresses an analytic function  of a matrix  as a polynomial in , in terms of the eigenvalues and eigenvectors of .  It states that

    

Conditions 
Sylvester's formula applies for any  diagonalizable matrix  with  distinct eigenvalues, 1, …, k, and any function  defined on some subset of the complex numbers such that  is well defined.

Example 

Consider the two-by-two matrix:

This matrix has two eigenvalues, 5 and −2. Its Frobenius covariants are

Sylvester's formula then amounts to

Generalization 
Sylvester's formula is only valid for diagonalizable matrices; an extension due to Arthur Buchheim, based on Hermite interpolating polynomials, covers the general case:
,
where .

A concise form is further given by Hans Schwerdtfeger,
,
where  i  are the corresponding Frobenius covariants of

Special case

Therefore, for any analytic function ,

See also 
 Adjugate matrix
 Holomorphic functional calculus
 Resolvent formalism

References 

 F.R. Gantmacher, The Theory of Matrices  v I (Chelsea Publishing, NY, 1960)  , pp 101-103

Matrix theory